Laura Veendapi McLeod-Katjirua is a Namibian politician who has been Governor of the Khomas Region since 2012 and Deputy Secretary General of SWAPO since 2012. Previously she was Governor of Omaheke Region from 2001 to 2012. She was transferred to Khomas Region by President Hifikepunye Pohamba after she was elected as Deputy Secretary General of SWAPO on December 2, 2012.

Early life and education
Laura McLeod grew up in Gobabis, the regional capital of Omaheke. She went into Zambian exile in 1975 while she still was a teenager and completed her secondary education there at Nyango Education Centre in 1978. She graduated with a diploma in Public Administration from the United Nations Institute for Namibia, and with a Teacher's Diploma from the National Institute for Public Administration in 1982, both located in Lusaka. McLeod then stayed in Botswana, Angola, and East Germany and returned to Namibia in 1989. Upon Namibian independence in 1990, she worked as an agricultural technician.

Political career
McLeod was elected Regional Councillor for Omaheke Region in 2001, and Governor in 2002. She was the first female Governor of Omaheke. In the same year she was elected to the SWAPO Central Committee. In December 2012 she was elected as SWAPO Deputy Secretary-General, a position considered number four in the SWAPO hierarchy.

Private life
McLeod-Katjirua has one son and one daughter.

References

Living people
Governors of Khomas Region
Governors of Omaheke Region
Politicians from Windhoek
SWAPO politicians
Women regional governors of Namibia
Year of birth missing (living people)
Women governors and heads of sub-national entities
21st-century Namibian women politicians
21st-century Namibian politicians